The 41st Australian Film Institute Awards (generally known as the AFI Awards) were held on 13 November 1999. Presented by the Australian Film Institute (AFI), the awards celebrated the best in Australian feature film, documentary, short film and television productions of 1999. The nominations were announced on 13 October 1999. Two Hands received the most nominations in the feature film category with eleven, while SeaChange received seven nominations in the television category.

Winners and nominees
Winners are listed first and highlighted in boldface.

Feature film

Non-feature film

Television

Additional awards

References

External links
 The Australian Film Institute | Australian Academy of Cinema and Television Arts official website

AACTA Awards ceremonies
AACTA Awards
AACTA Awards
AACTA Awards
AACTA Awards